The Voice of Vietnam is a reality television singing competition created by John de Mol. It premiered in Vietnam in July 2012 on Vietnam Television. The format is Dutch and the original Dutch version of the programme was broadcast in the Netherlands for the first time in 2010 as The Voice of Holland. The programme was commissioned after a successful first season in the United States, where the programme aired on NBC domestically and AXN Asia regionally. It is produced by Cát Tiên Sa.

Format
Contestants are aspiring singers drawn from public auditions. The show's format features three stages of competition. The first is the blind audition (vòng giấu mặt), in which four coaches listen to contenders without seeing them, and turn their chairs to signify that they are interested in working with that contestant. If more than one coach turns the chair, the contestant chooses the coach he or she would like to work with. The blind audition ends when each coach has fourteen (Vietnamese version) contestant to work with. Coaches will dedicate themselves to developing their singers, giving them advice, and sharing the secrets of their success. Since season 5, the block (chặn) are added. Coaches can block another coaches to prevent they having an artist, in season 6, coaches can press the block button even after they turned their chair but they can't block the special coach.

The competition then enters into a battle round (vòng đối đầu), when the coaches pick two of their own team members against each other to sing the same song together in front of a studio audience.  After the one-on-one battle on stage, the coach must choose which singers will advance to the next round, which can be either the Knockouts or the Live shows. Another twist is added on season 2, the steal. Coaches can steal 2 losing artists from another teams and they will be switching to that team. In season 4, coaches only have 1 wildcard save and can't steal

The Knockout Round was added in season two, adapting from the U.S version. At this round, two contestant from the same team are paired against each other to sing individually in succession. Contestants are not informed who their opponents will be since coaches will decide the pairs directly onstage. At the end of the two performances, only one contestant will be saved by his/her coach to advance to the Live shows.

In the live performance phase of the competition, contestants from each team compete against each other during a live broadcast. The television audience vote to save one contestant on each team, leaving the coach to decide live who they want to save and who will not move on. In the semi-final round, the public directly chooses between the two contestant left on each team based upon an online music video produced and released by the executive producers.

Finally, each coach will have his/her best contestant left standing to compete in the finals, singing an original song.

Coaches and hosts
On March 14, 2012 four coaches were chosen, namely Thu Minh, Trần Lập, Hồ Ngọc Hà and Đàm Vĩnh Hưng. They guided a team of fourteen. The first season is hosted by Phan Anh, former host of Vietnam Idol, while V.Music band, including 4 members, and Phương Mai take the role of backstage and social media correspondents respectively. After the finals of the first season, Thu Minh announced her departure from the show for a European resident. Hồ Ngọc Hà and Trần Lập did not return as well due to professional reasons. Three new coaches recruited for season 2 were Mỹ Linh, Hồng Nhung and Quốc Trung.

On March 6, 2015, Tuấn Hưng confirmed he would become a coach for the show's third season. A week later, Đàm Vĩnh Hưng was announced to be returning to the show for his third season. On April 13, 2015, the coaching panel for season 3 was officially confirmed as Tuấn Hưng, Đàm Vĩnh Hưng, Thu Phương and Mỹ Tâm. Phan Anh continued his job as host in season 2 and season 3.

Coach Trần Lập died after a long battle with rectal cancer on 17 March 2016.

On January 4, 2017 it was announced that Thu Minh would return to her red chair for the show's fourth cycle after 2 seasons absence; while former Vietnam Idol Kids judge Tóc Tiên as well as two coaches from The Voice Kids, Đông Nhi and Noo Phước Thịnh would be joining the show as coaches. This marks the first time in any franchise of The Voice worldwide to have 3 female coaches and only one male coach. The fourth season is hosted by Nguyên Khang, former host of The X Factor Vietnam.

Auditioning for the fifth season was held from December 2017 to March 2018. On April 6, 2018, the coaching panel for season 5 was revealed with coaches Thu Phương, Noo Phước Thịnh and Tóc Tiên returning, while former The Voice Kids coach Lam Trường filled the last spot. Former Sing My Song presenter Phí Linh replaced Nguyên Khang as host along with season 4 winner Ali Hoàng Dương who served as the backstage presenter for season 5, and remained in the following season. On 12 March 2019, it was confirmed that Tuấn Hưng would be returning to his red chair for the series' sixth season. The following day, it was announced that veteran The Voice Kids coach Hồ Hoài Anh, singers Tuấn Ngọc and Thanh Hà have joined the coaching panel for season six. However, midway through the season, Tuấn Hưng announced he would not be returning to the show in future seasons.

Timeline of coaches and hosts

Coaches' advisors

Series overview 
Key

Coaches' teams
Colour key:

Season synopses

Season 1 

The first season of The Voice of Vietnam began on 8 July 2012 and ended on 13 January 2013. The four original coaches are Đàm Vĩnh Hưng, Thu Minh, Hồ Ngọc Hà and Trần Lập, with Phan Anh hosting the show. This season didn't feature the "steal" and the Knockout round, contestant who won their battle were qualified for the live shows. Each coach was allowed to advance seven top to the live shows:

Season 2 

Season 2 of The Voice of Vietnam began on May 19, 2013 and concluded on December 15, 2013. Three new coaches were Mỹ Linh, Hồng Nhung and Quốc Trung, while Đàm Vĩnh Hưng and Phan Anh returned as coach and host, respectively. This season adopted the "Steals" in the battles as well as the Knockout round. Each coach was allowed to advance five top to the live shows:

Season 3 

Season 3 of The Voice of Vietnam began on May 10, 2015 and concluded on September 20, 2015. Đàm Vĩnh Hưng and Phan Anh returned for their third season as coach and host, respectively. Mỹ Tâm, Thu Phương, and Tuấn Hưng replaced Mỹ Linh, Hồng Nhung and Quốc Trung respectively. This season featured the "Steals" in the battles but did not have the Knockout round, contestant who won their battle were qualified for the live shows. Each coach was allowed to advance seven top to the live shows:

Season 4 

Season 4 of The Voice of Vietnam began on February 12, 2017 and concluded on June 4, 2017. Thu Minh returned to her red chair after a 2-season hiatus, along with three new coaches: Tóc Tiên, Noo Phước Thịnh and Đông Nhi. Each coach was allowed to advance four top to the live shows:

Season 5 

Season 5 of The Voice of Vietnam began on May 20, 2018 and concluded on September 2, 2018, with returning coaches Tóc Tiên, Noo Phước Thịnh, Thu Phương and new coach Lam Trường completing the panel. Because of the format change, the numbers of contestant advanced to the live shows are not equal among four teams. Contestants who advanced to the live shows included:

Season 6 

Season 6 of The Voice of Vietnam began on April 14, 2019 and concluded on July 14, 2019, with returning coach Tuấn Hưng and new coaches Thanh Hà, Tuấn Ngọc and Hồ Hoài Anh. Contestants who advanced to the live shows included:

Kids Edition 

After the success of the first season of The Voice, Cat Tien Sa announced that they would produce The Voice Kids, where 6-15 year-olds compete against each other. The first season was premiere on the Children's Day in Vietnam, June 1, 2013. The presenters are Trấn Thành and Thanh Thảo. The coaches are three instead of four: the husband-and-wife duo Hồ Hoài Anh and Lưu Hương Giang, Hiền Thục and Thanh Bùi.

For season 2 in 2014, Hồ Hoài Anh & Lưu Hương Giang returned along with two new coaches, Cẩm Ly and Lam Trường. New presenters were Thanh Bạch and Jennifer Phạm. For the third season premiered in July 2015, The X Factor Vietnam judge Dương Khắc Linh replaced Lam Trường, while the duo Giang Hồ and singer Cẩm Ly remained.

After season 3 finale, it was announced that the duo Giang Hồ would leave the show because of Lưu Hương Giang's pregnancy. Hồ Hoài Anh then moved to become the show's music executive. As Cẩm Ly also stated not to return either, Cat Tien Sa decided to refresh the judging panel with younger singers in Vietnam. Đông Nhi & Ông Cao Thắng were the first coaches confirmed for season 4. Noo Phước Thịnh came on board in early April. Even though rumors stated that the fourth coach would be Sơn Tùng M-TP, on June 6, 2016 it was officially confirmed that The Voice of Vietnam season 2 runner-up Vũ Cát Tường would become a coach.

On May 28, 2017, in an interview, Soobin Hoàng Sơn revealed that he has signed to become a coach for The Voice Kids season 5. On June 11, 2017, Vũ Cát Tường announced her return to the show. On June 26, 2017, the double chair was revealed to be composed of Hương Tràm, The Voice season 1 winner; and musician Tiên Cookie. Actor and comedian Thành Trung joined the show as host for season 5.

On July 12, 2018, the show's producers announced that all coaches for season 6 would be duos, and that former coaches Hồ Hoài Anh and Lưu Hương Giang would return for the sixth season. A week later, Vũ Cát Tường confirmed to be returning to the show for her third year. The following day, Soobin Hoàng Sơn also confirmed to be returning, while former The Voice season 1 contestant Bảo Anh was announced as a new coach. On July 31, music producer Khắc Hưng was announced as the new sixth coach for the sixth season. On the taping day at August 2, 2018, it was revealed that the two new coaches would form a new duo coach, whereas Soobin and Vũ Cát Tường would combine as a duo coach. The Voice season 4 winner Ali Hoàng Dương appointed as the new host for season 6. This season marks the first time in any version of The Voice worldwide to have three different duo coaches, and the second time that the judging panel consists of six coaches, following the Belgian-Flemish version.

On June 12, 2019, three new duo coaches were announced for season 7 as: musician Dương Cầm & 2018 Miss International Queen Hương Giang, Ali Hoàng Dương & Lưu Thiên Hương, and Dương Khắc Linh & Phạm Quỳnh Anh; while Hồ Hoài Anh would once again become the music executive. A reimagined eighth season premiered in January 2021 with BigDaddy & Emily, Hưng Cao & Vũ Cát Tường and Hồ Hoài Anh & Lưu Hương Giang as three duo coaches.

External links
The official website
The official site on Facebook page

References
List of television programmes broadcast by Vietnam Television (VTV)

 
Vietnam Television original programming
2010s Vietnamese television series